Jean Thibaudeau (7 March 1935 – 18 December 2013) was a French writer and translator.

A novelist, essayist, playwright and translator, he was a member of the editorial board of the literary magazine Tel Quel.

He translated into French works by Julio Cortázar, Edoardo Sanguineti, Italo Calvino. He was also the author of an innovative radio work that has been translated and adapted in many countries.

Works 
1960: Une cérémonie royale, Paris, Éditions de Minuit, Prix Fénéon (1961)
1966: Ouverture, Paris, Éditions du Seuil
1967: Ponge, Paris, Éditions Gallimard, serie "La bibliothèque idéale"
1968: Imaginez la nuit, novel, éd. du Seuil, series "Tel Quel"
1970: Mai 1968 en France, preceded by Printemps rouge by Philippe Sollers, éd. du Seuil, series "Tel Quel"
1972: Socialisme, avant-garde, littérature : interventions, Paris, 
1974: Ouverture... Roman noir ou Voilà les morts, à notre tour d'en sortir, éd. du Seuil
1978: L'Amour de la littérature, Paris, Flammarion
1979: L'Amérique, Flammarion, series , 
1984: Journal des pirogues, Paris, L'Un dans l'autre, series "Palimpsestes",  
1987: Mémoires : album de familles, Seyssel, éd. , series Liber"
1991:Souvenirs de guerre : poésies et journal, followed by Dialogues de l'aube, Paris, Hatier, series "Haute enfance" 
1994: Comme un rêve : roman et autre histoires, Paris, éd. Écriture, 
1994: Mes années "« Tel quel » : mémoire, Éd. Écriture, 
1999: Lettres à Jean Thibaudeau, Francis Ponge. Présentation et notes du destinataire, Cognac, Éditions Le Temps qu'il fait
2004: Préhistoires, Monaco / Paris, Éditions du Rocher, series "Esprits libres", 
2011: Ouverture [romans], Grenoble, de l'incidence éditeur,

Theatre 
With Nelly Borgeaud,  (et al.). Performed in Avignon, 21 July 1985.

Radio interviews 
1975: [Five] interviews with Alain Robbe-Grillet, France Culture. 1 recordable CD (1 h 07 min 55 s), Institut national de l'audiovisuel, series "Entretiens avec...", 1986
1976: [Four] interviews with Italo Calvino, France Culture, 2 recordable CDs (54 min 27 s et 51 min 19 s), Institut national de l'audiovisuel, series "Entretiens avec...", 1986

Radio Fictions 
1961: Reportage international d'un match de football réalisé par , France Culture. 1 CD (74 min), éditions Phonurgia nova / Ina, series "Les Grandes heures de la radio..", 1998. 
1998: Mai 68 en France, 1 book and 1 compact disc of sound archives of the May events by Europe1, éditions Phonurgia nova, series "Les Grandes heures de la radio.."

References

External links 
 Jean Thibaudeau tel quel
 Réédition en sons et mots on Libération (11 June 1998)
 Jean Thibaudeau on France Culture
 Jean Thibaudeau on Who's Who
  Jean Thibaudeau, Ouverture (romans) on De l'Incidence

1935 births
People from La Roche-sur-Yon
Lycée Henri-IV alumni
20th-century French essayists
21st-century French essayists
20th-century French novelists
21st-century French novelists
Spanish–French translators
Italian–French translators
Prix Fénéon winners
2013 deaths
20th-century French translators